Naugachia railway station (station code: NNA) is on the Barauni–Katihar section of the Sonpur railway division and serves the town of Naugachia in the Indian state of Bihar.

Geography 
The station lies on the northern side of the Ganges and traverses the Kosi basin. In Bihar, the Kosi is widely referred to as the "Sorrow of Bihar" as it has caused widespread human suffering over the centuries through flooding and frequent changes in course. In August 2008, it picked up an old channel it had abandoned over a century ago near the Nepal–India border, and caused enormous damage in a wide area covering several districts. The breach in the Kosi embankment which caused the devastating flood in 2008, was repaired in 2009 and the river has since been flowing along its original course. The floods continue and threaten even the Barauni–Katihar tracks. The entire region portrays "a bleak picture of broken houses, flattened fields and ravaged lives, signs of all the havoc the previous floods and land erosion wreaked here earlier."

Trains

Major Trains

 New Delhi–Dibrugarh Rajdhani Express (Via New Tinsukia)
Lokmanya Tilak Terminus–Kamakhya AC Superfast Express
 Katihar - Delhi Junction,  Champaran Humsafar Express
Kamakhya–Anand Vihar Express
Kamakhya - Delhi Northeast Express
Agartala - Deoghar Weekly Express
Guwahati-Jammu Tawi Amarnath Express
Guwahati - Jammu Tawi Lohit Express
Dibrugarh–Chandigarh Express
New Jalpaiguri -Rajendra Nagar Capital Express
Kamakhya-Patna Capital Express
Dibrugarh - Lokmanya Tilak Terminus Superfast Express
Kamakhya - Jodhpur, Bhagat Ki Kothi Express
Alipurduar - Delhi Junction Mahananda Express
Kamakhya - Udaipur City Kavi Guru Express
New Tinsukia–Rajendra Nagar Weekly Express
Guwahati - Bikaner Express
Guwahati - Okha Dwarka Express
Guwahati - Barmer Express
Dibrugarh-Lalgarh Avadh Assam Express
Kamakhya - Dr. Ambedkar Nagar Express
Kamakhya–Shri Mata Vaishno Devi Katra Express
 New Jalpaiguri - Ranchi Weekly Express
 Anand Vihar Terminal - Jogbani Seemanchal Express
 Katihar Junction - Amritsar Amrapali Express
 Kishanganj - Ajmer Garib Nawaz Express
 Muzaffarpur - SMVT Bengaluru Weekly Express
 Saharsa - Sealdah Hate Bazare Express
 Katihar - Tatanagar Express

Electrification
As of 2011, work on electrification of Barabanki–Gorakhpur–Barauni–New Jalpaiguri route was in progress. Adequate funds have been provided in the budget for 2011–12 to take up work in the New Jalapiguri–New Bongaigaon–Guwahati section.
The section is fully electrified. Most of the Delhi and Amritsar-bound trains run on electric locomotives. Amrapali Express was the first train to run on electric locomotive, then after Rajdhani Express, North-east Express, Purvottar Sampark Kranti Express, Seemanchal Express, Tripura Sundari Express have electric engines.

References

Sonpur railway division
Railway stations in Bhagalpur district